The Taking of Planet 5 is a BBC Books original novel written by Simon Bucher-Jones & Mark Clapham and based on the long-running British science fiction television series Doctor Who. It features the Eighth Doctor, Fitz and Compassion. It is, in part, a sequel to the television serial Image of the Fendahl. It also features references to many elements from the Cthulhu Mythos stories of H. P. Lovecraft, in particular the Elder Things and their ancient Antarctic city from At the Mountains of Madness.

See also
 Fifth planet (hypothetical)

External links
The Cloister Library - The Taking of Planet 5

Reviews
The Whoniverse's review on The Taking of Planet 5

1999 British novels
1999 science fiction novels
Eighth Doctor Adventures
Cthulhu Mythos novels
British science fiction novels
Novels by Simon Bucher-Jones
Novels by Mark Clapham
Faction Paradox